Falcon Patrol II (also called Falcon Patrol 2 on the box) is a horizontally scrolling shooter for the Commodore 64 written by Steve Lee and published by Virgin Games in 1984. A ZX Spectrum port was released in 1985. Falcon Patrol II is the sequel to the 1983 game Falcon Patrol.

Gameplay

Falcon Patrol II is a scrolling shooter over a landscape resembling Egypt or the Middle East. The player controls a jet fighter and has to destroy a set number of enemy helicopters to clear a level. The helicopters come in three forms:

Transport: unarmed helicopter that lays missile turrets and radar interference devices on the ground
Gunship: escorts the transport helicopters and shoots at the fighter
Solo: fast combat helicopter that goes right after the fighter.

The jet fighter has a finite supply of fuel and ammunition, but both can be replenished by landing on a landing pad.

References

External links
 
 
 Falcon Patrol II at C64 Wiki (German)
 

1984 video games
Commodore 64 games
Horizontally scrolling shooters
Video game sequels
Video games set in the Middle East
Virgin Interactive games
ZX Spectrum games
Video games developed in the United Kingdom